Impossible Mission 2025 is a side scrolling platform and action game for the Amiga computer system. It's a remake of the 1984 game Impossible Mission. It was released by MicroProse in 1994 as two different versions. One for the Amiga 500 and 600 systems, and a version for the AGA enhanced Amiga 1200, 4000 and CD32 systems. A third version was developed for the Super NES and Sega Genesis, but never released.

Characters
The player can take control of either the female Tasha, male Felix Fly, or robot RAM 2. Each have different strengths and weaknesses.

Tasha: Tasha, full name Natassia Tambor, graduated from the Moscow Republic University in 2023. She was the youngest woman to receive a PhD in Applied Cybernetics. Tasha decided not to become a scientist and instead chose to follow a career of gymnastics, an obsessive love of hers. Tasha is a 100% organic contender in the 21st century sport of Augmented Gymnastics, a sport where people transform themselves into ugly, part human, part machine athletes and then perform in front of millions of viewers on TV.
RAM 2: RAM 2 is one of the SORIU series of robots that were designed and built for the Pacific Alliance by Elvin Enterprises. He is made of an alloy that can shift between solid and liquid states. The SORIU series of robots remain the backbone of the Alliance's Automated Defence Force (ADF). RAM 2 is one of only 2 RAM (Recon and Mediation) units ever constructed. After RAM 1 was destroyed by Elvin, RAM 2 decided to seek vengeance against the evil man.
Felix Fly: Felix graduated top of his class at the Pacific Alliance Military Academy and moved onto a short but glorious career with the Nova Tigers: The 8th Squadron, Orbital Marine Corps. He became a national hero and retired after being nearly killed in the Algarski Conflict.

The player can choose to play as any of the three characters.

Development
Producer Stuart Whyte explained the motivation behind Impossible Mission 2025: 

The source code for Impossible Mission had been lost in an earthquake, so programmers Tim Cannell and Paul Dunning had to hack the Commodore 64 version of the game and retrieve its assets so that the game could be included in Impossible Mission 2025. For the new game, lead designer Scott Johnson recalled, "We really wanted to have scrolling included but still retain the essence of the original gameplay. What I really wanted to keep was the awesome animation from the originals. We ended up building the characters as 3D meshes in 3DS and rendering the animation out as bitmaps."

The appearance of Elvin Atombender was difficult to pull off, according to artist Drew Northcott. To get a visual image of the powersuit's "mix of encumbrance and empowerment", Northcott taped bricks to his bike boots and mic stands to his arms, then stomped around an empty office while art director Andy Cook videotaped him.

The game was originally developed for the Super NES and Genesis, with the Amiga versions to follow after. The Super NES version was announced in 1994, but neither it nor the Genesis version were released. Whyte explained, "... Microprose had gotten way late into the console space and were trying to catch up, and the 16-bit consoles were reaching the end of their lifespan. Ordering large quantities of cartridges from Japan was a risky thing, and due to this there were fewer releases than we'd hoped." A review was published in the August 1994 issue (Volume 63) of Nintendo Power, which claimed the Super NES version would've featured more sophisticated graphics and smoother play control than the prior versions.

Technical information
There are three versions of Impossible Mission 2025. A standard version for the Amiga 500 and Amiga 600, an enhanced (AGA) version for the Amiga 1200 and Amiga 4000 systems and a CD32 version based on the AGA. The versions required 1 and 2MB of RAM respectively. The game is hard disk installable. There is manual copy protection which involves the user being required to type the number from the bottom of a specific page. The game also comes with a built in system which will make fair use backups for the user.
The CD32 version received additional animations for intro, ending and between levels, and CD audio music.

See also
List of Amiga games

References

External links

Impossible Mission 2025 at the Hall of Light

1994 video games
Action video games
Amiga games
Amiga 1200 games
Cancelled Sega Genesis games
Cancelled Super Nintendo Entertainment System games
Amiga CD32 games
Single-player video games
Spy video games
Video game remakes
Video games developed in the United States
Video games scored by Allister Brimble
Video games set in 2025